10–28 Nicholas Street is a terrace of houses on the west side of the street in Chester, Cheshire, England.  It is recorded in the National Heritage List for England as a designated Grade II listed building.

History

The terrace was built in 1780.  It was designed by Joseph Turner, and originally consisted of ten town houses. The terrace became known as "Pillbox Promenade", or "Pillbox Row", because many of the houses were used as doctors' surgeries.  It is the "longest and most uniform of any of the Georgian properties in Chester".

Architecture

The houses are constructed in brown brick in Flemish bond, with stone dressings and grey slate roofs.  They are in three storeys plus a basement, and contain sash windows.

See also

Grade II listed buildings in Chester (central)

References

Houses in Chester
Grade II listed buildings in Chester
Grade II listed houses
Georgian architecture in Cheshire
Houses completed in 1780
Joseph Turner (architect) buildings